= Degang Chen =

- Citizenship: China
- Education: Tsinghua University (BSc); University of California, Santa Barbara (MSc, PhD)
- Occupations: Researcher, academic
- Employer: Iowa State University
- Title: Professor

Degang Chen professor at Iowa State University, was named Fellow of the Institute of Electrical and Electronics Engineers (IEEE) in 2016 for contributions to testing of analog and mixed-signal integrated circuits.

Chen obtained his BS from Tsinghua University in 1984 and then his MS and Ph.D. in Electrical and Computer engineering from the University of California, Santa Barbara in 1988 and 1992 respectively.
